The Flight Design MC (Metal Concept) is a German light-sport aircraft, designed and produced by Flight Design, introduced at AirVenture in 2008. The aircraft is supplied as a complete ready-to-fly-aircraft.

Design and development
The MC design was based on the general shape of the CT series, but rendered in metal and with a strut-braced wing, in place of the CT series' composite construction and cantilever wing. The design goal was to provide a more robust design, primarily for flight school use. The resulting MC has a lower cruise speed as well as less payload and range than the comparable Flight Design CTLW.

The MC was designed to comply with US light-sport aircraft rules. It features a strut-braced high-wing, a two-seats-in-side-by-side configuration enclosed cockpit, fixed tricycle landing gear and a single engine in tractor configuration.

The MC's structure is totally different from the CT series. Aircraft fuselage is made from welded steel tubing forming a safety cage around the cockpit, with crumple zones built in. The wings and tail are predominantly aluminum sheet. The landing gear legs are composite and are adapted from the CTLS. To simplify fuel management the wing fuel tanks all feed via a single lever fuel supply system. A ballistic parachute is standard equipment. Standard engines available are the  Rotax 912UL and the  Rotax 912ULS and Rotax 912iS four-stroke powerplants.

Variants
MCi
Version with the Rotax 912iS  engine.

Specifications (MC)

References

External links

Official website

MC
Light-sport aircraft
Single-engined tractor aircraft
High-wing aircraft
Aircraft first flown in 2008